The 13th Senate of Spain was a meeting of the Senate of Spain, the upper house of the Spanish Cortes Generales, with the membership determined primarily by the results of the general election held on 28 April 2019. The Senate met for the first time on 21 May 2019 and was dissolved prematurely on 24 September 2019.

Election
The 13th Spanish general election under the 1978 Constitution was held on 28 April 2019. It saw the Spanish Socialist Workers' Party (PSOE) become the largest party in the Senate for the first time since 1993, while securing its first overall majority since 1989.

History
The new senate met for the first time on 21 May 2019 and elected Manuel Cruz (PSOE) as President of the Senate of Spain.

Other members of the Bureau of the Senate were also elected on 21 May 2019: Cristina Narbona (PSOE), First Vice-President; Pío García-Escudero (PP), Second Vice-President; Fernando Martínez (PSOE), First Secretary; Olivia Delgado (PSOE), Second Secretary; Imanol Landa (EAJ), Third Secretary; and Rafael Hernando (PP), Fourth Secretary.

In July 2019 caretaker Prime Minister Pedro Sánchez (POSE) failed to secure the necessary votes in the Congress of Deputies to form a government after the failure of coalition talks with UP–ECP. Sánchez announced on 17 September 2019 that an election would be held on 10 November 2019, the fourth in as many years. The 13th Cortes Generales was formally dissolved on 24 September 2019.

Deaths, disqualifications, resignations, suspensions and regional legislature appointments
The 13th senate has seen the following deaths, disqualifications, resignations, suspensions and regional legislature appointments:

Elected senators
 29 May 2019 – Jailed Catalan senator Raül Romeva (ERC–Sob), currently being tried on charges of rebellion, sedition, criminal organization and misuse of public funds in relation to the Catalan independence referendum and subsequent declaration of independence, is suspended from senate.
 3 July 2019 – Francisco Valera (PSOE) resigned after being appointed vice president of the Albacete provincial council. He was replaced by María Victoria Leal (PSOE) on 4 July 2019.
 16 July 2019 – José Valbuena (POSE) resigned after being appointed Minister of Ecological Transition of the Canary Islands. He was replaced by Pedro Meneses (PSOE) on 17 July 2019.
 18 July 2019 – Yaiza Castilla (ASG) resigned after being appointed Minister of Tourism and Industry of the Canary Islands. He was replaced by Fabián Chinea (ASG) on 19 July 2019.
 25 August 2019 – Antonio Amador (PSOE) resigned after being appointed communications delegate of the Teruel provincial council. He was replaced by Joaquín Noé (PSOE) on 26 August 2019.
 8 September 2019 – Clara San Damián (PP) resigned after being appointed the regional government's delegate in Zamora. She was replaced by María Martín (PP) on 9 September 2019.

Appointed senators
 8 May 2019 – José Montilla (PSOE) resigned.
 11 June 2019 – Jesús Fermosel (PP), Jaime González (PP) and Juan Soler-Espiauba (PP) ceased being appointees of the Assembly of Madrid.
 17 June 2019 – Idoia Villanueva (UP) resigned after being elected to the European Parliament.
 19 June 2019 – Pedro Sanz (PP) ceased being the appointee of the Parliament of La Rioja.
 26 June 2019 – Jesús Vázquez (PP), Elena Muñoz (PP) and José Manuel Sande (EM) appointed by the Parliament of Galicia.  
 27 June 2019 – Emilio Argüeso (Cs), Josefina Bueno (PSOE), Alberto Fabra (PP), Joan Lerma (PSOE) and Carles Mulet (Compromís) appointed by the Corts Valencianes.
 1 July 2019 – Virginia Felipe (UP) resigned. 
 5 July 2019 – José Muñoz (PSOE) died.
 10 July 2019 – Guillermo del Corral (PSOE) ceased being an appointee of the Parliament of Cantabria.
 10 July 2019 – José Cepeda (PSOE), Tomás Marcos (Cs), Jacinto Morano (UP) and Encarnación Moya (PSOE) ceased being appointees of the Assembly of Madrid.
 11 July 2019 – Francesc Antich (PSOE) and Toni Fuster (PP) ceased being appointees of the Parliament of the Balearic Islands.
 11 July 2019 – José Miguel Fernández (PRC) appointed by the Parliament of Cantabria.
 11 July 2019 – José Cepeda (PSOE) and Tomás Marcos (Cs) re-appointed by the Assembly of Madrid. Ana Camins (PP), David Erguido (PP), Pilar Llop (PSOE), Eduardo Rubiño (MM) and Carlota Santiago (Cs) appointed by the Assembly of Madrid.
 12 July 2019 – José Vicente Marí (PP) and Vicenç Vidal (Més) appointed by the Parliament of the Balearic Islands.
 18 July 2019 – Rafael Lemus (PSOE) and Diego Sánchez (PP) ceased being an appointees of the Assembly of Extremadura.
 19 July 2019 – Francisco Bernabé (PP) and Francisco Oñate (PSOE) ceased being appointees of the Regional Assembly of Murcia.
 19 July 2019 – Rafael Lemus (PSOE) re-appointed by the Assembly of Extremadura. José Antonio Monago (PP) appointed by the Assembly of Extremadura.
 20 July 2019 – Lourdes Retuerto (PSOE) and Miguel Sánchez (Cs) appointed by the Regional Assembly of Murcia.
 22 July 2019 – Nemesio de Lara (PSOE) ceased being an appointee of the Cortes of Castilla–La Mancha.
 23 July 2019 – Ignacio Cosidó (PP), Antidio Fagúndez (PSOE) and Juan José Lucas (PP) ceased being appointees of the Cortes of Castile and León.
 23 July 2019 – Carolina Agudo (PP), Jesús Fernández (PSOE) and María Teresa Fernández (PSOE) appointed by the Cortes of Castilla–La Mancha.
 23 July 2019 – Raúl Díaz appointed by the Parliament of La Rioja.
 24 July 2019 – Francisco Díaz (PSOE), María Teresa López (PSOE) and Javier Maroto (PP) appointed by the Cortes of Castile and León.
 30 July 2019 – Julio Cruz (PSOE), María del Mar Julios (CCa) and Jorge Rodríguez (PP) ceased being appointees of the Parliament of the Canary Islands.
 31 July 2019 – Asier Antona (PP), Fernando Clavijo (CCa) and Pedro Ramos (PSOE) appointed by the Parliament of the Canary Islands.
 5 September 2019 – Marcelino Iglesias (PSOE) and Luisa Rudi ceased being an appointees of the Aragonese Corts.
 6 September 2019 – Luisa Rudi (PP) re-appointed by the Aragonese Corts. Clemente Sánchez-Garnica (PAR) appointed by the Aragonese Corts.

Members

See also
 13th Cortes Generales
 13th Congress of Deputies

Notes

References
 
 

2019 establishments in Spain
2019 disestablishments in Spain
 
Senate of Spain